Jean Bastien (21 June 1915 – 7 August 1969) was a professional French footballer.  He was born in Oran, French Algeria, and died, aged 54, in Marseille.

References
 Profile
 Profile

1915 births
1969 deaths
French footballers
France international footballers
Ligue 1 players
Olympique de Marseille players
Racing Club de France Football players
Montpellier HSC players
1938 FIFA World Cup players
Footballers from Oran
French football managers
Montpellier HSC managers
Pieds-Noirs
Association football midfielders